John R. Plewa (September 22, 1945September 13, 1995) was an American educator and Democratic politician from Wisconsin.  He served 10 years in the Wisconsin State Senate and 12 years in the State Assembly, representing Milwaukee.  Plewa is most well-known for authoring Wisconsin's 1988 family and medical leave law.

Biography

Born in Milwaukee, Wisconsin, Plewa graduated from Milwaukee's Don Bosco High School in 1963.  He went on to earn his bachelor's degree from the University of Wisconsin–Whitewater in 1968.  Following his graduation, he worked as a teacher at the Milwaukee Area Technical College and was a member of the United Steelworkers union.

In 1970, he was a candidate in a four-way primary which unseated incumbent state senator Leland McParland, losing to Kurt Frank. In 1972, Plewa was elected to the Wisconsin State Assembly serving until 1984, when he was elected to the Wisconsin State Senate in a special election after incumbent Jerry Kleczka was elected to the Congressional seat long held by Clement Zablocki.

He was a member of the Cudahy Jaycees, and the United Steelworkers Union. The Lake Parkway of Wisconsin Highway 794 was named in memory of Senator Plewa.

References

External links
 

|-

Politicians from Milwaukee
University of Wisconsin–Whitewater alumni
Members of the Wisconsin State Assembly
Wisconsin state senators
1945 births
1995 deaths
20th-century American politicians